John Borland Thayer II (April 21, 1862April 15, 1912) was an American businessman who had a thirty-year career as an executive with the Pennsylvania Railroad Company. In his youth, Thayer was also a prominent sportsman, playing baseball and lacrosse for the University of Pennsylvania and first-class cricket for the Philadelphian cricket team. He is the only first-class cricketer known to have died aboard Titanic.

Early life and cricket career

Thayer was born in Philadelphia and attended the University of Pennsylvania, where he was captain of the lacrosse team in 1879 and played baseball. A member of a prominent American cricketing family, he played his first match for the Merion Cricket Club as a 14-year-old and continued playing for them until his death. Thayer was a part of the Philadelphian side that visited England in 1884. During that tour, he scored only 1 run, with an average of 28, and took 22 wickets for 21 runs each. In his career, Thayer appeared in seven matches now recognised as first-class matches. Three of these were played for the Philadelphians, and four were played for an "American-born" side. All were played at the Germantown Cricket Club in Pennsylvania. In his first-class career, he scored 138 runs at 11.50 and took six wickets at 26.83. His highest score (24) and best bowling (3 for 17) both came for Philadelphia against the United States in October 1883. In minor cricket, his highest scores were 134 not out v Philadelphia in 1896 and 107 not out against Winnipeg in 1882, both for Merion CC.

Family 
On November 9, 1892, in Philadelphia, he married Marian Longstreth Morris (1872–1944), the daughter of Frederick Wistar Morris and Elizabeth Flower Paul. Both her parents were descendants of old-moneyed Philadelphia families. They had four children:
 John "Jack" Borland Thayer III (1894–1945)
 Frederick Morris Thayer (1896–1956)
 Margaret Thayer (1898–1960) (Mrs. Harold Elstner Talbott Jr.)
 Pauline Thayer (1901–1981) (Mrs. Henry Hoffman Dolan)

Thayer's wife, Marian, boarded one of the lifeboats as a First Class passenger and survived the Titanic's sinking. Of the four children, only Jack accompanied his parents on the ill-fated vessel. A 17-year old at the time, he survived by jumping into the freezing water and swimming to an overturned lifeboat just as the ship went under.

Pennsylvania Railroad career 

After leaving the University of Pennsylvania in 1881, Thayer entered the service of the Pennsylvania Railroad as a clerk in the Empire Line office, remaining in that position for about eighteen months, when he was transferred to the general freight department. After holding various positions in 1888 he was appointed freight solicitor of the United Railroads of New Jersey division.

From February, 1889, to May, 1892, Thayer was out of railway work before returning to the PRR in May, 1892, as division freight agent of the Northern Central, with headquarters at Baltimore, MD. On December 1, 1894, he was promoted to assistant general freight agent, with office at Philadelphia, Pa., and in March, 1897, was made general freight agent in charge of through traffic. In May 1899, he was appointed general freight agent also of the Northern Central, the Philadelphia, Wilmington & Baltimore, and the West Jersey & Seashore. Thayer was elected fifth vice-president of the Pennsylvania Railroad June 1, 1903, becoming manager of traffic on that road. 

In October, 1905, Thayer was promoted to fourth vice-president; in March, 1909, third vice-president; and, in March, 1911, second-vice president, his ultimate rank at the company. At the time of his death Mr. Thayer was a senior director of the Pennsylvania Railroad, managing the railroad's busiest operations east of Pittsburgh, including those of the Long Island and the New York Connecting roads. Thayer was also director and president of the Erie & Western Transport Union Company as well as a director on the Norfolk & Western and the Leigh & Hudson River roads. He was a member of a large number of prestigious clubs and organizations, including the Philadelphia Club, the Union League and the Union Club of New York, the Metropolitan Club of Washington. D. C, the Railroad Club of New York, and the Chamber of Commerce of the State of New York.

A minute adopted by the Board of Directors of the Pennsylvania Railroad after his death said in part:

The Titanic
In the spring of 1912 Thayer and his family had been in Europe as guests of the American Consul General in Berlin, Germany. As the ship sank, Thayer made sure his wife and maid boarded lifeboats, after being told by the Titanic's designer, Thomas Andrews, that the stricken ship did not have "much over an hour to live". His son Jack dove from the sinking ship and was able to swim to an overturned collapsible boat, where he also survived. However, Thayer Sr. made it clear that he had no intention of boarding a boat, and he remained on the Titanic as it sank. When all of the lifeboats were gone, one eyewitness reportedly saw Thayer looking "pale and determined by the midship rail aft of lifeboat 7." A short while later, he had gone, so it is likely that he moved to the stern like many other passengers and crew.

Initially, the British media had reported that Thayer had survived the sinking, due to confusion between Thayer and his son. Thayer's body, if recovered, was never identified.

See also
 Passengers of the RMS Titanic

Sources
 Croudy, B. "Cricket in Philadelphia – The Great Families", The Cricket Statistician, No. 113, Spring 2001. The Association of Cricket Statisticians and Historians; West Bridgford, Nottingham.

References

External links
 

1862 births
1912 deaths
19th-century American railroad executives
American cricketers
Cricketers from Philadelphia
Pennsylvania Railroad
Pennsylvania Railroad people
Philadelphian cricketers
Thayer family
Deaths on the RMS Titanic
University of Pennsylvania alumni
Penn Quakers baseball players
Penn Quakers lacrosse